Edwin M. Stanton School is an historic K-8 school located in the Southwest Center City neighborhood of Philadelphia, Pennsylvania, within the Christian Street Historic District. It is part of the School District of Philadelphia.

The building was added to the National Register of Historic Places in 1988.

History and features

The building was designed by Irwin T. Catharine and built in 1925–1926. It is a three-story, 10-bay by 3-bay, made of bricks on a raised basement in the Art Deco-style. The entrance features a portico with Doric order columns and terra cotta colored tiles.  It also has a stone cornice with colored terra cotta tile and a brick parapet. The school was named for Edwin M. Stanton.

The building was added to the National Register of Historic Places in 1988.

It feeds students to South Philadelphia High School.

Gallery

References

External links

School buildings on the National Register of Historic Places in Philadelphia
Art Deco architecture in Pennsylvania
School buildings completed in 1926
School District of Philadelphia
Southwest Center City, Philadelphia
Public K–8 schools in Philadelphia
1926 establishments in Pennsylvania